La herencia is a 2015 Peruvian comedy film written and directed by Gastón Vizcarra. Starring Tatiana Astengo, Christian Thorsen, Aldo Miyashiro, Alessandra Denegrí, Jesús Alzamora, Claudia Dammert and Korina Rivadeneira. It premiered on July 23, 2015, in Peruvian theaters.

Synopsis 
The Bailetti family finds out that their grandfather has died and that he has left a large inheritance. To collect it there is only one curious condition: they must spend a weekend together. New and unknown members of the family from all over Peru will arrive for the meeting, generating a series of entanglements.

Cast 
The actors participating in this film are:

 Tatiana Astengo
 Christian Thorsen
 Aldo Miyashiro
 Alessandra Denegrí
 Jesús Alzamora
 Claudia Dammert
 Korina Rivadeneira

Production 
The film began filming at the end of January 2015 in Lima, Peru.

Reception

Critical reception 
Sebastián Zavala from cinencuentro.com wrote: "La herencia is a bad movie. It has salvageable elements, some good performances and it is not very long, but as a comedy, as a professional audiovisual product, it is quite disastrous." On the other hand, Omar Cáceres from Lamula.pe wrote: "La herencia is a nice film that respects the viewer. It won't cause many laughs, it won't be the great story one would expect from a comedy, but it won't be visually degrading. Maybe with an improvement in the script (a riskier and less predictable story) it would have worked better."

Box-office 
The film attracted 127,714 viewers throughout its run in Peruvian theaters.

References

External links 

 

2015 films
2015 comedy films
Peruvian comedy films
2010s Spanish-language films
2010s Peruvian films
Films set in Peru
Films shot in Peru
Films about families